The Dawoodi Bohras are a religious denomination within the Ismā'īlī branch of Shia Islam. Their largest numbers reside in India, Pakistan, Yemen, East Africa, and the Middle East, with a growing presence across Europe, North America, South East Asia, and Australia. Most estimates put the worldwide population to be one million.

The Dawoodi Bohras are known to be a close-knit community who, like all Muslims, follow the tenets of Islam; namely reciting the Quran, observing the five daily prayers, fasting during the month of Ramadan, performing the pilgrimages of Hajj and Umra and offering Zakat. Whilst adherence to traditional values is important for the community, they are also known for their mercantilism and having a modernist approach to their lifestyles.

The cultural heritage of this denomination is found in the traditions of the Fatimid Imams; direct descendants of the Islamic prophet Muhammad through his daughter Fatima. The Fatimids ruled over North Africa between 10th and 11th century CE.

Mostly self-reliant, the Bohras are typically traders, businesspersons, and entrepreneurs. The word "Bohra", in fact, comes from the Gujarati word vohrvu or vyavahar, meaning "to trade".

History 
Dawoodi Bohras are a subset of Taiyebi, Musta'li, Isma'ili, Shia Islam. The Bohras trace their heritage to the Fatimid Caliphate, named after Fatimah, the daughter of Muhammad, and so veneration of the Fatimid Imams and Muhammad's family is central to their faith.

Fatimid imams 
The Fatimids, from the lineage of the Hashimites of Mecca, ruled over North Africa and Egypt, Hejaz, and Levant between the 10th and 11th centuries. The Fatimids flourished during what Maurice Lombard called the Golden age of Islam, and were patrons of arts, learning, and scientific discovery. The 14th Imam, al-Mui’zz, founded what is the modern day city of Cairo and established Al-Azhar University, which is one of the oldest universities in the world.

Before the empire's decline, Al-Amir bi-Ahkam Allah, the 20th Fatimid imam, directed his grand emissary, Arwa bint Ahmad, the Sulayhid queen of Yemen, to establish the office of the Da'i al-Mutlaq to act as vicegerent of his son, the 21st Imam At-Tayyib Abu'l-Qasim while he was in occultation, and to lead al-Da'wah al-Hadiyah. Arwa bint Ahmad appointed Zoeb bin Musa as the first Da'i al-Mutlaq.

Succession to the office of al-Da'i al-Mutlaq happens through nass, whereby each Da'i—inspired and guided by the Imam al-Zamaan—appoints a successor in his own lifetime, and this chain of succession continues uninterrupted to this day. The present incumbent to the office is the 53rd Da'i al-Mutlaq, Mufaddal Saifuddin.

Origins in India 

The roots of the community's establishment in India go back to the Fatimid era, when Al Mustansir Billah, the 18th Imam, sent a Dai named Abd Allah from Yemen to initiate the Da’wah on his behalf. Abd Allah arrived in Cambay (modern day Khambhat, Gujarat) in AD 1067/ H 460 and soon won many converts, including local rulers.

The seclusion of al-Tayyeb led to the establishment of the office of al-Dai al-Mutlaq in Yemen. Subsequently, the Indian community which had pledged allegiance to the Fatimids continued to remain loyal to the Dais in Yemen. This resulted in a secession with the Hafizis, led by Al-Tayyeb's uncle, Abd al-Majid. Twenty three Dais operated from their mountain bases in Yemen for nearly four centuries, preserving the faith and authoring seminal works. The 19th Dai, Idris Imaduddin wrote numerous works, including a comprehensive and detailed history of the Fatimid faith.

Meanwhile, the community in Gujarat had maintained ties with their leaders in Yemen, who closely supervised their affairs and regularly welcomed Bohra delegations from Gujarat. During this time, the community grew in size, especially in Cambay, Patan, Sidhpur, and Ahmedabad.

Yusuf bin Sulayman Najmuddin, originally from Sidhpur, a town in Gujarat, was one of the  Bohras who travelled to Yemen to seek knowledge from the Dai. Najmuddin arrived in Yemen while still in his youth and first studied under Hasan bin Nuh al-Bharuchi. He was eventually nominated by the twenty-third Dai as his successor and became the first from the Indian community to lead the Tayyibi Da’wa as the twenty-fourth al-Dai al-Mutlaq. When Najmuddin died in CE 1567/H 974, the central headquarters of the Da’wa were transferred from Yemen to Gujarat by his Indian successor, Jalal bin Hasan, who established residence at Ahmedabad.

When the 26th al-Dai al-Mutlaq died in CE 1589 /H 997, he was succeeded by his deputy, Dawood Bin Qutubshah. However, three years later, Sulayman bin Hasan, a high-ranking dignitary in Yemen, claimed the succession to the leadership of the community for himself. This succession dispute was brought before the Mughal emperor Akbar in 1597. A special tribunal decided in favour of Dawood Bin Qutubshah. However, this did not dissolve tensions, leading to a schism in the community. A majority of  Bohras acknowledged Dawood Bin Qutubshah as the rightful successor and henceforth came to be known as Dawoodis (or Da’udis.)

Major centres 

Over the next few centuries, the Bohra headquarters moved within India with the changing location of the Dai. The centre of the Da’wah has shifted six times: Ahmedabad (eight Dais, from 1567/974 to 1655/1065); Jamnagar in the Kathiawar region of Gujarat (five Dais, from 1655/1065 to 1737/1150); Ujjan in present day state of Madhya Pradesh (two Dais, from 1737/1150 to 1779/1193); Burhanpur, Madhya Pradesh (one Dai, from 1779/1193 to 1785/1200); Surat in present day state of Gujarat (eight Dais, from 1785/1200 to 1933/1351) and Mumbai in the state of Maharashtra where the current Dai resides.

Beginning from the early 19th century, several community members emigrated to different lands in search for better livelihoods. The first wave of Bohra traders migrating to East Africa took place in the aftermath of a severe drought in Kathiawar. The 43rd Dai, Abdeali Saifuddin, invited 12,000 of his followers to Surat, and provided food, work and lodgings for all of them. His only conditions were that they learn and practice vocational skills, and he gave them their earnings when it was time for them to leave Surat. Many from this group decided to use this capital to venture forth to trade in East Africa.

A century on from Abdeali Saifuddin, Taher Saifuddin succeeded him to the office of al-Dai al-Mutlaq as the 51st Dai, and his leadership was challenged almost immediately upon assuming the office. Taher Saifuddin is credited with revitalising the community by restructuring its organisation on modern lines.

He shifted the community headquarters from Surat to Mumbai, which had become a major centre of trade and commerce in India. His emphasis on acquiring higher education across disciplines saw many young Dawoodi Bohras go on to settle in different parts of the globe resulting in thriving new communities.

There is a tiny community of Bohras in Kerala too, who migrated 150 years ago from Gujarat.

Office of the al-Dai al-Mutlaq 
During the seclusion of the imam, al-dai al-mutlaq is the vicegerent of the imam appointed to lead the community and administer with complete authority, its secular and religious affairs.

The dai preaches Quranic precepts, which are the foundation of the faith, and guides the community upon the path of salvation. Over the last nine centuries that this office has been in existence, each dai has played an important role in shaping the community’s social and economic progress. Community members seek and abide by his counsel in different aspects of life. Their disciplined life, piety, scholarship and judicious guidance have defined the office of al-dai al-mutlaq.

The first dai, Dhu'ayb bin Musa, was appointed in 532/1138 in Yemen by Queen Arwa bint Ahmed when the 21st Imam went into seclusion. Since then, 23 dais, one following the other, established the Dawat in Yemen over the next 400 years. After nearly four centuries, the seat of the Dawat was transferred from Yemen to India, where the 24th dai, Yusuf bin Sulayman Najmuddin, became the first dai to assume office from this region. Despite territorial and political upheavals through different periods, the dais persevered and continued to lead the faithful and preserve the faith.

The current leader of the Dawoodi Bohra community is the 53rd al Dai al Mutlaq, Syedna Mufaddal Saifuddin who lives in India.

Faith and belief

Monotheism 

As Muslims, the Dawoodi Bohras believe in Tawhid, Islam's central monotheistic concept of a single, indivisible God, Allah. They recite the Shahada stating there is no God but Allah, and Muhammad is the messenger of Allah.

Walayah 
Walayah, which is devotion to Allah, Muhammad, his family, and his descendants, is the central of the seven pillars of the Dawoodi Bohra faith. The other six are tahaarat (purity in body and thought), salaat (daily ritual prayers), zakaat (offering a portion of one's income in the cause of Allah), sawm (fasting, particularly in the month of Ramadan), hajj (a ritual pilgrimage to Mecca), and jihad (striving in the way of Allah). The Bohras build mosques wherever they live to congregate for prayers and majalis (religious occasions) for the zikr of Allah and his prophets, imams, and da'is.

Traditions and practices

Qardan Hasana
Islam prohibits riba and interest, and so the Dawoodi Bohras follow the practice of Qardan Hasana, which are essentially interest-free loans. Based on the ideal of being advantageous to the borrower (as opposed to the lender), this model has played an important role in the economic growth within the community.

The Bohras voluntarily contribute to an institutionally-maintained loan corpus on a regular basis, which is seeded by a substantial contribution from the Da'i al-Mutlaq themself. This corpus is managed by respective city-wise committees appointed by the office of the Da'i al-Mutlaq. The Bohras use these loans to buy houses, pay for education, and fund businesses.

Mithaq
The central rite of initiation and adoption for the Bohras is the mithaq. This ceremony is a covenant between the believer and God, effected through God's representative on earth. The mithaq binds a believer to the duties owed to Allah, including an oath of allegiance: a vow to accept the spiritual guidance of the Da'i al-Mutlaq wholeheartedly and without reservation. This ceremony, akin to baptism in Christianity, is mandatory to enter the fold of the faith.

The mithaq is first taken at whatever age a child is deemed to have reached maturity: most commonly, thirteen years for girls, fourteen or fifteen for boys. These vows are renewed over a period of Bohra's adult life: In one such instance, on the eighteenth day of the Islamic month of Zil Hijjah, Bohras renew their mithaq vows together.

Calendar 

The Dawoodi Bohra follow Fatimid-era tabular calendar which matches exactly with the lunar cycle of 354 days and hence requires no adjustments. The odd-numbered months have 30 days and the even-numbered months have 29 days, except in a leap year when the final month, the 12th month Zil Hajj, has 30 days. This contrasts with other Muslim communities, which base the beginnings of specific Islamic months on sightings of the moon crescent.

Festivals 
During Ramadan, the 9th month of the Islamic calendar, the Dawoodi Bohras observe mandatory fast from dusk to dawn. The Bohras congregate in their local mosques for daily prayers, but particularly for the evening prayers, and break the day-long fast and have the iftaar meal together. Like in the rest of Islamic world, Ramadan is a month of heightened devotional activity for the Bohras, which ends with Eid al-Fitr.

In the month of Zil Hajj al-Haram, the Bohras undertake hajj and celebrate Eid al-Adha at its conclusion. In line with Shi'a traditions, on the 18th of Zil Hajj, the day Muhammad publicly anointed Ali ibn Abi Talib his successor, the Bohras celebrate Eid al-Ghadir, observe fast, and offer special prayers. Special prayers and congregations are also held during other major events such as the day Muhammad first began his Da'wah, the night of Isra and Mi'raj, the birthday of Muhammad, the urs mubarak of prominent community leaders, and the birthday of the current Da'i al-Mutlaq.

Muharram

Husayn ibn Ali was martyred along with his family and companions in the plains of Karbala while on a journey from Mecca, through the deserts of modern-day Iraq, to Kufa, the seat of the erstwhile Rashidun caliphate. The Bohras believe that Husayn's sacrifice was foretold by Muhammad, and that he was destined to change the course of Islam as a result of his martyrdom. Remembrance of the martyrdom of Husayn ibn Ali, often linked to the hagiography of John the Baptist and Jesus Christ, is among the most important events of the year for the Bohras.

Known as ʿAshara Mubāraka, a series of ten majālis that happen in the beginning of the month of Muharram al-Haram, is a source of blessing and a means to spiritual purification for the Bohras. For them, Husayn ibn Ali's martyrdom epitomizes the values of humanity, justice, and truth. That his stand against tyranny, even at the cost of great personal sacrifice, offers lessons in bravery, loyalty, and compassion. These values, they believe, inculcate in them a spirit of self-sacrifice, forbearance, and adherence to their faith.

During the ʿAshara Mubāraka, the Bohra communities all over the world host a series of majālis twice a day, one each in the morning and in the evening, recounting Husayn ibn Ali's sacrifice, which forms the central theme of the discourse amidst regular prayers. The majālis led by the Da'i al-Mutlaq on occasion attract hundreds of thousands of followers.

In 2020, in accordance with government regulations in response to the COVID-19 pandemic, the community observed ʿAshara Mubāraka remotely from their homes. Audio and video recording of sermons delivered in the preceding years by Taher Saifuddin, Mohammed Burhanuddin, and Mufaddal Saifuddin were broadcast to the community worldwide. While volunteers of community kitchens, Faiz al-Mawaid al-Burhaniyah, prepared and distributed cooked meals to every home; members of local Jami'ats, especially the young, ensured senior members had access to sermons and prayers broadcast online.

Office and administration 

The office of the Da'i al-Mutlaq, known as Alvazartus Saifiyah, oversees Dawat-e-Hadiyah, which in turn governs secular and religious affairs of the close-knit Dawoodi Bohra community through a distributed network of Jamaat committees. Dawat-e-Hadiyah head office is at Badri Mahal in Fort, Mumbai.

Several sub-committees and trusts administering different aspects of a local Bohra community operate under the purview of respective Jamiat (also called Jamaat or Anjuman). Setup anywhere where Bohras live and work, a jamiat usually numbers around hundred to tens of thousands of Bohras. A resident Amil, appointed by Dawat–e-Hadiyah, is the de facto president of a given jamiat. The appointed Amil administers and manages socio-religious affairs of a jamiat. At the local mosque or markaz under their jurisdiction, the Amil leads daily prayers, and presides over sermons and discourses on various religious occasions.

Demographics and culture
As of 2021, there are an estimated two to five million Dawoodi Bohras that reside in over 100 countries. The majority reside in the Indian state of Gujarat and in the Pakistani city of Karachi. A sizeable diaspora is spread across Europe, North America, the Middle East, and East Africa.

The Bohras are primarily traders and businesspersons, while some are industrialists and skilled professionals.

Name and etymology
The word Bohra takes root in the Gujarati word vohrvu, in reference to their traditional occupation as traders. The prefix Dawoodi is in reference to Dawood Bin Qutubshah, the 27th Da'i al-Mutlaq, who emerged as the leader of the majority following a schism in 1588.

Language 
Dawoodi Bohras are a blend of Yemeni, Egyptian, African, Pakistani, and Indian cultures. Their common tongue, Lisan al-Dawat, written in Perso-Arabic script, derives from Arabic, Urdu, Persian, Sanskrit, and Gujarati. Lisan al-Dawat, which takes its basic structure from Gujarati and vocabulary from Arabic, developed as a medium to articulate Islamic values and heritage. Though Arabic remains community's dominant liturgical language, Lisan al-Dawat is its language of sermons and its medium of official and day to day communication.

Dress 
The Dawoodi Bohras wear a distinct form of attire. The men traditionally dress in a predominantly white, three-piece outfit: kurta, a form of tunic; saaya, an overcoat of equal length; and izaar, loose-fit trousers; with topi, a white cap usually laced in a golden arabesque design. Men, adhering to the customs of Muhammad, are expected to grow a full beard.

The women wear a two piece dress called rida distinct from hijab, purdah, and chador. The bright colors, decorative patterns and lace, and the fact that it does not cover a woman's face are its distinguishing features. The rida is of any colour except black. A flap called pardi is folded to one side to allow a woman's face to be visible but it can be worn over the face when desired.

Cuisine 

Joining each other for meals is a well-known Dawoodi Bohra custom. Families and friends gather around sharing the meal from a single large raised circular tray called thaal. The thaal is raised upon a kundali or tarakti made of wood or metal, on top of a safra, a large cloth that covers the floor. Each course of meal is served one after the other for those at the thaal to share.

The meal begins and ends with a taste of salt, which per their tradition, cleanses the palette and prevents diseases. Bohras usually cover their heads during the meal with a topi, a cap; and eat with their hands. A common etiquette is for the host to offer to clean their guests' hands using a chilamchi lota (basin and jug). Leftovers are a cultural faux pas. Those seated at the thaal are encouraged to take smaller portions and expected to finish those.

The Bohra cuisine, influenced by Gujarati, Persian, Yemeni, and Egyptian cuisines, is known for its unique taste and dishes such as bohra-style biryani, dal chaawal palidu (rice, lentils, and curry), kheema samosa (minced mutton sambosa), dabba gosht (steamed-mutton-in-a-box), and masala bateta (spicy potatoes).

Community kitchens 
In 2012, Mohammed Burhanuddin II, the 52nd Da'i al-Mutlaq, established Faiz al-Mawaid al-Burhaniyah (FMB) community kitchens in Mumbai to deliver at least one meal per day to all Bohra families in the city, and to ensure no one goes to bed hungry. FMB proved beneficial to women in particular as household work reduced, freeing up time to pursue other productive activities. Meals are delivered in tiffin containers daily, and has a rotating menu. As of 2021, FMB community kitchens, usually built near mosques, are operational in every Bohra community throughout the world.

Whilst FMB has substantially increased food security within the Bohra community, in times of wider crisis (such as the flooding in Texas or the COVID-19 pandemic), it has also supplied meals and provisions to the wider society. Bohras consider Niyaz, feeding their brethren and those less fortunate, an obligation.

Rasm-e Saifee

To subsidize costs and facilitate marriages among the Dawoodi Bohra, Taher Saifuddin, the 51st Da'i al-Mutlaq, started Rasm-e Saifee in Jamnagar  and later institutionalised it . Rasm-e Saifee is a singular occasion when multiple Nikah are solemnized at the hands of the Da'i al-Mutlaq and his representatives.

Later, Mohammed Burhanuddin, Saifuddin's son and successor, founded International Taiyseer al-Nikah Committee (ITNC), which now organizes Rasm-e Saifee throughout the year at various miqaat. Burhanuddin's successor, Mufaddal Saifuddin, continues to uphold the tradition.

Community centres

Masjid 
While a Dawoodi Bohra mosque is primarily a place of worship and congregation, it forms an important socio-cultural hub for the community. Besides sermons and discourses, the mosques are also a center for education and special religious lessons, keeping in line with Fatimid traditions. A mosque complex usually houses several administrative offices along with ceremonial halls. The mosques are built in a distinct Neo-Fatimid style, with the names of Allah and verses from the Quran engraved on its walls. The mosques are multi-storied structures; the main prayer hall in the ground floor, a voluminous space, is used by men while women congregate in the upper floors. The centre of the prayer hall is left as a void making it possible for the women to hear and follow religious liturgy and sermons from the floors above.

The Masjid-e-Moazzam complex in Surat is among the largest in the community.

The first Dawoodi Bohra mosque in the Middle East was inaugurated in Dubai, UAE in 1983, by Mohammed Burhanuddin. Later, mosques in Sharjah, Dubai, and Ajman were opened in 2003, 2004, and 2006 respectively.

In 1988, Burhanuddin inaugurated Burhani Masjid in Farmington Hills, Michigan, the first Dawoodi Bohra mosque in North America, and a year later, in 1990, the first Canadian mosque in Toronto.

A community center was later set up at Fulham. Decades later, in 1996, Burhanuddin presided over the opening of the first Bohra mosque in Europe in Northolt. Burhanuddin's wife, Amatullah Aaisaheba, is buried within its premises. On 8 July 2007, the first Bohra mosque in France in Paris was inaugurated.

The Bohras migrated to the erstwhile British colony of Ceylon from Gujarat . An estimated 2,500 Bohras live in Sri Lanka and the capital city of Colombo is their largest settlement. In 2000, Burhanuddin inaugurated Masjid al-Hussaini at Glen Aber Place, Colombo, the largest Dawoodi Bohra mosque in Sri Lanka, which was the venue of Ashara Mubaraka in 2008, 2009, and 2019. The masjid is part of a bigger complex called Burhani Park, which has a community centre and a school.

Burhanuddin's son, Mufaddal Saifuddin inaugurated Mohammedi Masjid, the largest Bohra mosque complex in North America, at Katy Area, Houston during the 2015 Ashara, which was, at the time, the largest Bohra community event held in the West. The same year, in March 2015, Saifuddin inaugurated four more mosques in California in Los Angeles, San Jose, Bakersfield, and Orange County.

In 2014, as his first official act as the 53rd Da'i al-Mutlaq, Mufaddal Saifuddin inaugurated Masjid Mansoor al-Yemen in the Haraaz region of Sanaa governorate. Burhanuddin had built the masjid in memory of Amatullah, his wife.

Markaz 

A bohra community (or jamaat) is centered around a markaz when there is no existing mosque nearby.

Jamaat Khaana 
Communal meals are served in dining halls called the jamaat khaana, which are generally part of the mosque complex.

Mausoleums

It is customary among the Bohras to visit mausoleums, mosques, and other places of religious importance in Palestine, Israel, Jordan, Syria, Egypt, Saudi Arabia, Yemen, Iran, Iraq, and India. In most places, a community-administered complex (mazaar) provides accommodation, business centers, dining, and various recreational activities to the traveling Bohras.

A Bohra mausoleum typically has white exteriors with a golden finial at the apex of the dome. The interior is usually lit up in incandescent light and Quranic verses are inscribed on its walls. These mausoleums embody several meanings in the form of its structure and build. As an example, Raudat Tahera, an austere structure, has a range of intricacies deliberated into its design. The inner height of Raudat Tahera is 80 feet above the plinth: the number signifies the age of Taher Saifuddin, who is buried there. The sanctum of the mausoleum is 51 × 51 feet, which symbolises Saifuddin's position as the 51st Dai al-Mutlaq. The entire Quran is inscribed in gold on its walls, whilst Bismillah is engraved 113 times in precious stones, and four doors, one on each side of the wall, are made of silver. The inner side of the dome proclaims, "Allah holds the sky and earth together which none else can."

Education

In line with Islamic traditions, the Bohras seek both religious and secular education. Women education is actively encouraged. In the modern day, higher education is commonplace in the community.

Community-run Madrasah Saifiyah Burhaniyah (MSB) chain of international co-ed schools teach sciences, humanities, and arts, in addition to theological subjects. In 1984, Mohammad Burhanuddin established the first MSB in Nairobi and Mumbai. As of 2021, 24 MSB schools in Asia and Africa operate affiliated to IGCSE and ICSE boards.

Al Jamea tus Saifiyah (Jamea) is community's primary educational and cultural institute. Select students go through rigorous Islamic and Arabic studies for up to 11 years, and are trained to subsequently lead various institutions run by Dawat-e-Hadiyah. Jamea precedes Dars-e-Saifee, an Islamic theology school established by the 43rd Da'i al-Mutlaq Abdeali Saifuddin, in 1814 in Surat, Gujarat. A century later, the 51st Da'i al-Mutlaq Taher Saifuddin renovated and institutionalized it as a University. His son and successor, Mohammed Burhanuddin, further expanded its reach and scope, opening up campuses in three more cities and establishing a dedicated center for Qur'anic sciences, Mahad al-Zahra. The second campus was founded in 1983 in Karachi, Pakistan. A third campus was established in Nairobi, Kenya in 2011, with a fourth in 2013 in Mumbai, India. The libraries of Jamea preserve some of the oldest known Arabic manuscripts. Other departments of Jamea specialize in the art of Quran recitation, Arabic calligraphy, and Arabesque design.

A significant volume of treatises, discourses, and sermons of the Dua't Mutlaqeen are part of the Jamea curriculum. Per tradition, the current Da'i al-Mutlaq presides over annual examinations (al-Imtihan al-Sanawi) every year. Senior Jamea students additionally undergo a public viva voce examination (Shafahi Imtihan) where they are questioned by rectors of the institute and occasionally by the Da'i al-Mutlaq, as well.

Social work 

The Bohras are politically neutral. The community's stance, in line with sunnah, has been to be loyal to one's country of residence. A migratory race, they participate in the culture and society they live in, but stay conservative enough to preserve their own identity. The Bohra philosophy and way of life is informed by the Aristotelian and Neo-Platonic Epistles of Ikhwan al-Safa. Such that, they believe every religion is related to one another, that all creation share the same purpose. and that true fulfillment is in achieving balance between religious and societal duties, in resourcefulness and philanthropy.

Environmental activism 
The Bohras actively participate in environmental activism and consider it their religious duty. Since Nazafat is an integral component of Islamic faith, the Bohras engage in clean-up drives, tree planting, and other such initiatives wherever they reside.

The Burhani Foundation 

In 1991, Mohammed Burhanuddin established Burhani Foundation, a charitable trust for environmental security, conservation of biological diversity, effective utilisation of resources, pollution control, and other related measures. In 2017, Mufaddal Saifuddin, Burhanuddin's successor, initiated a worldwide program to plant 200,000 saplings. In 2018, the Bohras, together with Champions of the Earth, launched Turning the Tide, a campaign to remove plastic from oceans, rivers, and beaches in India.

Zero food waste 
Under the aegis of FMB, Dana Committee is charted to eliminate food wastage. As of 2021, the committee has 6000 volunteers across 40 countries. After congregations, these volunteers collect leftovers and distribute it to the deprived. To prevent wastage of food due to over-cooking or poor turnout, the committee uses custom web and mobile RSVP apps. Before a meal commences, volunteers are on-hand to remind attendees of their responsibility as Muslims in ensuring no food goes waste. The Bohras also participate in the United Nations annual World Food Day campaigns.

In September 2019 over 24,000 who gathered in Colombo to commemorate Ashara Mubaraka with Mufaddal Saifuddin, the 53rd Da'i al-Mutlaq, followed "a zero food waste policy".  The Dana Committee volunteers helped with portion control and distributed leftover food to the disadvantaged. This policy was first adopted at the 2018 Ashara in Indore attended by over 150,000 people.

Social upliftment 
In June 2018, the Bohra community launched Project Rise, a philanthropy focused on the marginalized and the poor. Their first initiative, undertaken in collaboration with Action Against Hunger, sought to address malnutrition among those living in Palghar and Govandi districts.  During the 2019 floods, volunteers sent aid to the Indian states of Kerala, Karnataka, Maharashtra, and Gujarat; while during the 2020 lockdown in India, volunteers distributed food packets among the poor. Narendra Modi, the Prime Minister of India, acknowledged community's charity and service. The same year, just like a year before in 2019, volunteers in North America marked United Nations World Food Day by donating to local food banks.

Since then, based on Islamic traditions of philanthropy, Project Rise widened its scope with "upliftment" programs that focus on healthcare, nutrition, sanitation and hygiene, and environmental conservation. Annually, as part of these "upliftment" drives, volunteers attempt to raise the standard of living of the elderly and the disadvantaged through revamped housing, access to food, and improved physical and spiritual well-being.

Bhendi Bazaar cluster redevelopment 

In 2009, Mohammed Burhanuddin, the 52nd Da'i al-Mutlaq, founded Saifee Burhani Upliftment Trust (SBUT). Work on its first initiative, Saifee Burhani Upliftment Project (SBUP), to rebuild Bhendi Bazaar—a decrepit, under-developed, and dense Bohra-majority locale in South Bombay—commenced shortly after. Within a year of its formation, the trust which is composed of members of the Bohra community had acquired 70% of the identified land. 250 existing buildings, 1250 shops, and 3200 families in over 16.5 acres of land will make way for 13 new buildings, better infrastructure, open spaces, with designated commercial areas. Relocated tenants will own their new premises at no cost to them. Divided into 9 clusters, the project is expected to complete in 2025. 7 of the 9 clusters, representing over 80% of the project, are reserved for existing tenants and the government-run housing board, MHADA. Due to the scope of SBUP, the largest "cluster redevelopment" project in India at an estimated cost of $550 million (₹4000 crores), it has been subject to logistical and regulatory challenges, resulting in several delays.

Starting in 2010, the trust began building transit homes near Mazgaon. In 2012 the trust relocated tenants and demolished buildings it had acquired. More transit homes were built in Sion, Ghodapdeo, and Sewri. In early 2016 Mufaddal Saifuddin laid foundation for Clusters I and III. In 2020, 600 residents and 128 shop owners relocated to the completed twin towers Al Saadah, marking completion of the Phase I of the project.

Healthcare 

The Bohra community run over 25 hospitals and clinics in India, as well as a number of facilities in Pakistan and across the world.

Established in Mumbai in 1948, Saifee Hospital is the principal healthcare undertaking of the Bohra community. After it was rebuilt by Mohammed Burhanuddin, Manmohan Singh the then Prime Minister of India inaugurated it in 2005. The award-winning hospital is among the most sought after in the country.

Recognition 
: 2011: The Burhani Foundation under its campaign "Save Our Sparrows" (SOS), received the Guinness World Records award for the largest distribution of bird feeders.

: 2018: the Dawoodi Bohra community received an award for organizing the largest zero waste religious event during the Ashara Mubaraka sermons in Indore, by the Golden Book of World Records.

: 2018: the Dawoodi Bohra community of Indore received the "Swachh City Award" for being the "best citizen led initiative" under the Swachh Bharat Mission on 9 March 2019.

V K Singh praised the role of the Dawoodi Bohra community in help with Operation Rahat carried out by the Indian Navy to evacuate civilians during the Yemeni Civil War of 2015.

Status of women

Overview 
The status of women in the Bohra community underwent a major change in the latter half of the 20th century. According to Jonah Blank, women of the Bohra faith are among the best-educated women in the Indian subcontinent.  Female Bohra in the U.S. and Europe have become
business owners, lawyers, doctors, teachers and leaders in a range of professions. At an interfaith celebration of Eid al-Fitr hosted by the Dawoodi Bohra community of Detroit, Michigan, United States on 7 June 2019, U.S. Congresswoman Brenda Lawrence (Democrat, Michigan's 14th congressional district) praised the Bohras for having "used their voices to make progress on countless issues including gender equality and the environment."

Female genital mutilation 

The Dawoodi Bohra practice what they call khatna, khafd, or khafz, a practice critics consider female genital mutilation (FGM). The procedure is for the most part performed without anaesthesia by a traditional circumciser when girls reach their seventh year. Non-Bohra women who seek to marry into the community are also required to undergo it. There are no authoritative studies on the extent of the practice among the Bohra. A 1911 Bombay census of unknown reliability noted that they were performing clitorectomy. According to a 1991 article in Manushi, the Bohra remove either the clitoral hood or the tip of the clitoris. Supporters of the practice say that the Bohra remove only the clitoral hood or perform symbolic nicking, and that it should be referred to as "female circumcision", not FGM.

A qualitative study in 2018 carried out by WeSpeakOut, a group opposed to FGM, concluded that most Bohra girls experience Type I FGM, removal of the clitoral hood or clitoral glans. A gynaecologist who took part in the study examined 20 Bohra women and found that both the clitoris and clitoral hood had been cut in most cases. According to the Dawoodi Bohra Women's Association for Religious Freedom, the study's conclusions did not reflect the views of most Bohra women. In Australia in 2018, the convictions of three members of the Bohra community, related to performing FGM on two girls, were overturned when the appeal court accepted that the tip of each girl's clitoris was still visible and had not been "mutilated"; the defence position was that only "symbolic khatna" had been performed. The High Court of Australia overturned that decision in October 2019, ruling that the phrase "otherwise mutilates" in Australian law does encompass cutting or nicking the clitoris. As a result, the convictions were upheld, and the defendants received custodial sentences of at least 11 months.

See also 
 Succession to 52nd Dai al-Mutlaq
 List of Dai of Dawoodi Bohra
 Progressive Dawoodi Bohra

Notes

References

Further reading

External links 

 
 

 
Tayyibi Isma'ili branches
Social groups of Pakistan
Social groups of Sri Lanka
Muslim communities of India